Burley Wood is the site of an Iron Age hill fort north of Lydford in Devon, England. The fort occupies much of a hilltop some 220 metres above sea level overlooking the river Lew. The site also has a Norman motte-and-bailey earthwork just below it to the northeast at approx 215 metres above sea level.

References

Hill forts in Devon
Borough of West Devon